Jorge Calvo may refer to:

 Jorge Calvo (baseball) (1938–2009), Mexican baseball player and manager.
 Jorge O. Calvo (1961–2023), Argentine geologist and paleontologist.